Libya (Kingdom of Libya) competed with one person at the 1968 Summer Olympics in Mexico City, Mexico.

Results by event

Athletics
Men's 400 metres hurdles
 Mohamed Asswai
 Round 1 — 54.3 s (→ did not advance, 28th place from 28 competitors)

References
Official Olympic Reports
Part Three: Results

Nations at the 1968 Summer Olympics
1968
Olympics